Code Name: Tiranga is a 2022 Indian Hindi-language spy action drama film written and directed by Ribhu Dasgupta. The film is jointly produced by T-Series, Reliance Entertainment and Film Hangar. It stars Parineeti Chopra, Harrdy Sandhu and Sharad Kelkar. The film released on 14 October 2022 and received mostly negative reviews from critics.

Plot
spy on an unfaltering and fearless mission for her nation in a race against time where sacrifice is her only choice.

Cast
Parineeti Chopra as Durga Devi Singh / Ismat
Harrdy Sandhu as Dr. Mirza Ali
Sharad Kelkar as Khalid Omar
 Rajit Kapur as Kabir Ali
 Dibyendu Bhattacharya as Ajay Bakshi
 Shishir Sharma as Iftikar Khan
 Sabyasachi Chakrabarty as Ranjit Kapoor
 Deesh Mariwala as Goyal
 Prabhat Kumar Sharma as Agent Nair
 Erin Gurdal as Omar’s Wife
 Nishant Thakur as Sharma
 Prasoon Arya as Afghani Groom
 Ayushi Thakur as Afghani Bride
 Musap Eyma as Omar's Son
 Hasan Yanik as Omar's Security Guard
 Vikas Tomar as Family Member
 Merve Ozel as Ferozi
 Ayub Azam as Sameer Rao
 Umar Suhail as Haqqani

Production
The film's pre-production began around December 2020. It was announced, that Parineeti Chopra would play an undercover RAW agent in Ribhu Dasgupta's next. It is her second collaboration with Dasgupta post The Girl on the Train.

Harrdy Sandhu was cast opposite Chopra, while Sharad Kelkar was cast as the main antagonist.

Shooting of the film started in April 2021 in Turkey, where a major portion of the film was shot.

Soundtrack

The songs for the film are composed by Jaidev Kumar & Vipin Patwa and lyrics are penned by Kumaar, while a few lines of Bankim Chandra Chatterjee's Vande Mataram have been borrowed for a song of the same name. Background music score composed by Gilad Benamram.

Release
The film was theatrically released on 14 October 2022 and the same was announced on 20 September 2022. After the theatrical release, the film was made  available for streaming worldwide exclusively on Netflix from 16 December 2022.

Reception

Critical response
The film received mostly negative reviews. While praising the performance News 18 gave the film 3 out of 5 and wrote, "Ribhu Dasgupta’s direction film's script suffers from cliched and weak plot lines. It manages to engage the audience, taking full advantage of its breathtaking locations. Harrdy Sandhu is treat to watch while Parineeti Chopra slays as a RAW Agent."

Times of India gave the film 2.5 out of 5 and wrote, "It’s refreshing to watch Parineeti Chopra take on the villains with the sole intention of serving the country. Action choreography gets the maximum share of credit, as the story of this espionage thriller is quite predictable right from the beginning." India Today gave the film 1.5 out of 5 and noted, "Parineeti Chopra delivers a power-packed performance in Code Name: Tiranga. Her action scenes look flawless and well rehearsed. However, after a point, she fails to make an impact." They further noted, "There was absolutely no research put in behind a film about the country’s smartest, RAW".

NDTV gave 1.5 out of 5 said, "Code Name Tiranga, is a series of yawn-inducing gunfights interspersed with fleeting sequences in which the characters are given lines to speak. In a film that is literally all over the place, the actors have their jobs cut out. They struggle to rise above the deafening din and be heard and understood." Firstpost gave 0.5 out of 5 and mentioned, "Writing a woman as the lead in an actioner is the only good idea to be found in the entire length and breadth of this thrill-less espionage ‘thriller’, Code Name: Tiranga is a disaster. The wait continues." 

Scroll wrote, "Except for a point-of-view sequence in which Durga storms Khalid’s citadel, the 127-minute movie is too sluggishly staged to sell Parineeta Chopra as an action heroine. Harrdy Sandhu valiantly tries to be noticed in a film that is barely interested in him. The film isn’t interested in its own subject matter either. ABP News stated, "Parineeti's performance in the film deserves a special mention. She lends the right kind of pragmatic depth to the otherwise films about spies' who mostly have a straight face in all situations."

Box office
Code Name: Tiranga competed with the Ayushmann Khurrana-starred Doctor G, which was released on the same day. The film collected 
 crore at the domestic box office on its opening day. The film then collected 
 crore on day 2  and  crore on day 5. It ended its theatrical run on day 7 with a total collection of  crore.

References

External links 

 
 Code Name: Tirannga at Bollywood Hungama

Indian action drama films
2020s Hindi-language films
Films about terrorism in India
Films directed by Ribhu Dasgupta
Indian spy action films
Films shot in Turkey